Charles Kenneth Beatty (April 19, 1905 – September 28, 1977) was an American football and basketball coach. He was the first head football coach at East Carolina Teaching College—now known as East Carolina University—serving from 1932 to 1933 and compiling a record of 1–10.  Beatty was also the head basketball coach at East Carolina from 1932 to 1934, tallying mark of 12–17.  He was inducted into the East Carolina University Hall of Fame in 1974.

Head coaching record

Football

References

External links
 

1905 births
1977 deaths
East Carolina Pirates football coaches
East Carolina Pirates men's basketball coaches